Ryner is a surname. Notable people with the surname include:

Denise Ryner, Canadian curator and writer
Han Ryner (1861–1938), French anarchist

See also
Riner (surname)
Ryder (name)
Ryne
Wyner